"Johnny One Time" is a song written by A.L. "Doodle" Owens and Dallas Frazier and performed by Brenda Lee.  The song reached #3 on the adult contemporary chart, #41 on the Billboard Hot 100, and #50 on the country chart in 1969.  The song also reached #11 on the Canadian adult contemporary chart and #38 on the Canadian pop chart.  It was featured on her 1969 album, Johnny One Time.

The song was produced by Mike Berniker and arranged by Marty Manning.  Lee was nominated for the Grammy Award for Best Female Pop Vocal Performance for the song.

Chart history
Willie Nelson version

Brenda Lee version

Other versions
Willie Nelson released a version of the song as a single in 1968 that reached #36 on the country chart.
Hootenanny Singers released a version of the song entitled "Casanova" in 1969 as the B-side to "Om Jag Kunde Skriva En Visa".  The Swedish translation of the song was by Stig Anderson.
Loretta Lynn released a version of the song on her 1969 album, Woman of the World/To Make a Man.

References

1968 songs
1968 singles
Songs written by A.L. "Doodle" Owens
Songs written by Dallas Frazier
Brenda Lee songs
Willie Nelson songs
Loretta Lynn songs
Decca Records singles
RCA Records singles